Heteronygmia is a genus of moths in the subfamily Lymantriinae. The genus was erected by William Jacob Holland in 1893.

Species
The following species are recognised:

Heteronygmia chismona
Heteronygmia dissimilis
Heteronygmia flavescens
Heteronygmia leucogyna
Heteronygmia manicata
Heteronygmia opalescens
Heteronygmia rhodapicata
Heteronygmia rufescens
Heteronygmia strigitorna

References

Lymantriinae